Online research methods (ORMs) are ways in which researchers can collect data via the internet. They are also referred to as Internet research, Internet science or iScience, or Web-based methods. Many of these online research methods are related to existing research methodologies but re-invent and re-imagine them in the light of new technologies and conditions associated with the internet. The field is relatively new and evolving. With the growth of social media, a new level of complexity and opportunity has been created. The inclusion of social media research can provide unique insights into consumer and societal segments and gaining an "emotional" measure of a population on issues of interest.

Some specific types of method include:
Cyber-ethnography
Online content analysis
Online focus groups
Online interviews
Online qualitative research
Online questionnaires
Social network analysis
Web-based experiments
Online clinical trials – or see below

Online clinical trials 
Clinical trials are at the heart of current evidence-based medical care. They are, however, traditionally expensive and difficult to undertake. Using internet resources can, in some cases, reduce the economic burden, and may have other benefits in Medicine.  Paul et al.,  in The Journal of Medical Internet Research,  describe the background and methodologies of online clinical trials and list examples.

Research in and with social media 
The advent of social media has recently led to new online research methods, for example data mining of large datasets from such media or web-based experiments within social media that are entirely under the control of researchers, e.g. those created with the software Social Lab.

See also
 Internet mediated research

References

Further reading
 Hooley, Tristram  John Marriott and Jane Wellens, What is Online Research? Using the Internet for Social Science Research (Bloomsbury Academic, 2012)  (open access online)

External links
 Exploring online research methods
 Association of Online Internet Researchers Ethical Report
 iScience Server
 List of online research studies
 "Online Research Methodology: Using the Internet and the Web for Research and Publication"-Tarun Tapas Mukherjee, Bhatter College, Journal of Multidisciplinary Studies. Vol. 2, 2012. http://bcjms.bhattercollege.ac.in 
 The International Journal of Internet Science - a journal that publishes articles on online research methods
 Annual General Online Research Conference